The Traces of Light is a 1996 Iranian drama film written and directed by Hossein Shahabi.

Starring
 Shahram Khazaei
 Rahim Fallah
 Karim Nobakht
 Reza Novini
 Shahed Gorbani
 Kimia Saboori
 Mahin Bageri

Crew
 producer: Hossein Shahabi
 Production manager: Ghasem Salari
 Sound Recorder: Shahin Sohrabi
 Editor: Hossein Shahabi Hossein eyvazi
 Music: Hossein Shahabi
 Production: Baran film house 1996

References

1999 films
Iranian drama films
Films directed by Hossein Shahabi